Lim Su-Jeong (born ) is a former South Korean female Muay Thai kickboxer. She competes professionally since 2004 and is a former Southern Thailand Middleweight and South Korea Muay Thai Bantamweight Champion. Her good looks earned her the nickname Beautiful Fighter.

Kickboxing career
She started to train in Muay Thai for dieting when she was a high school student. She would be a quick learner, winning the South Korea Muay Thai Bantamweight title and the South Korean promotion Neo Fight Championship in 2006. At the age of 22, she went to Thailand for several months to practice Muay Thai. Here, she had success on the amateur circuit as well, winning bronze at the IMFA World Muaythai Championships 2007 held in Bangkok.

Lim then went on to have a very good 2009. She followed it up with her third professional title - winning the Southern Thailand Middleweight title by outpointing Sowlor from Thailand. There was some disappointment, however, when she lost in an upset in her debut in shoot boxing.

Lim first defeated Czech Alena Hola by unanimous decision after three rounds, and next she defeated fellow South Korean Woo Yeon Park also by decision to win the championship belt.

Lim was given the chance to fight for a world title on May 28, 2011, taking on Christine Theiss for the WKA fullcontact World Middleweight Championship. In front of Theiss's hometown crowd she lost a close decision.

Flames Sports Competition incident
In August 2011, Lim went on Japanese TV show Flames Sports Competition to take on three Japanese comedians in what was supposed to be a ‘mock’ fight. But instead she was beaten and seriously injured by the men, with the incident causing outrage in South Korea. When controversy erupted over the show, Japanese TV station TBS in an official announcement stated, “The match was convened not as a mockup based on a script, but a real match. Rules were debriefed in advance and Lim also consented.” In an interview with a Korean broadcaster, however, Lim’s side said she was told before filming that it would be a variety show after all. Since the match was conducted under prior mutual consent, her management said, she had nothing much to worry about.

Outside sports
Aside from kickboxing and Muay Thai, Lim, who is nicknamed Beautiful Fighter because  of her good looks, works as an actress as a side job. She appeared in TV series in South Korea and in the Thai martial arts film Chocolate.

Titles

Professional
2009 King of the Ring Grand Prix Champion
2008 Southern Thailand Middleweight Champion
2006 South Korea Muay Thai Bantamweight Champion 
2006 Neo Fight Bantamweight Champion 
2004 Rookie of the year of the Korean Muaythai Association

Amateur
2007 IFMA World Muaythai Championships in Bangkok, Thailand  -54 kg

Kickboxing record 

|-  style="background:#fbb;"
|-
|-  bgcolor="#FFBBBB"
| 2013-10-02 || Loss ||align=left| Iman Chairi || World Muaythai Angels || Bangkok, Thailand || Decision (0–3) || 3 || 2:00 || 
|-
|-  bgcolor="#CCFFCC"
| 2013-02-02 || Win ||align=left| Mao Ning || The Khan vs. Wulinfeng || Seoul, South Korea || Ext R. Decision (3–0) || 4 || 3:00 ||
|-
|-  bgcolor="#CCFFCC"
| 2012-01-15 || Win ||align=left| Miku Hayashi || The Khan New Generation || Tokyo, Japan || Decision (3–0) || 3 || 3:00 ||
|-
|-  bgcolor="#FFBBBB"
| 2011-05-28 || Loss ||align=left| Christine Theiss || Die Nacht der Champions || Munich, Germany || Decision (0–3) || 10 || 2:00 || 
|-
! style=background:white colspan=9 |
|-
|-  bgcolor="#CCFFCC"
| 2010-03-28 || Win ||align=left| Satoko Sasaki || J-Girls: Catch the stone 6 || Tokyo, Japan || Ext R. Decision (2–0) || 3 || 2:00 ||
|-
|-  bgcolor="#CCFFCC"
| 2009-11-27 || Win ||align=left| Woo Yeon Park || The Khan 2, Final || Seoul, South Korea || Decision (3–0) || 3 || 2:00 ||
|-
|-
! style=background:white colspan=9 |
|-
|-
|-  bgcolor="#CCFFCC"
| 2009-11-27 || Win ||align=left| Alena Hola || The Khan 2, Semi Finals || Seoul, South Korea || Decision (3–0) || 3 || 2:00 ||
|-
|-  bgcolor="#CCFFCC"
| 2009-09-26 || Win ||align=left| Chen Qing || K-1 World Grand Prix 2009 in Seoul Final 16 || Seoul, South Korea || Decision (3–0) || 3 || 3:00 ||
|-
|-  bgcolor="#FFBBBB"
| 2009-08-23 || Loss ||align=left| Mei Yamaguchi || Shoot Boxing Girls Tournament 2009, Quarter Finals || Tokyo, Japan || Decision (0–3) || 3 || 2:00 ||  
|-
|-  bgcolor="#FFBBBB"
| 2009-07-07 || Loss ||align=left| Phetnaree Krabi || Bangla Stadium || Phuket, Thailand || Decision || 5 || 2:00 || 
|-
|-  bgcolor="#CCFFCC"
| 2009-06-12 || Win ||align=left| NongMo || Bangla Stadium || Phuket, Thailand || TKO || 2 || ||
|-
|-  bgcolor="#CCFFCC"
| 2009-06-07 || Win ||align=left| Yinggan Ranong || Bangla Stadium || Phuket, Thailand || TKO || 2 || ||
|-
|-  bgcolor="#CCFFCC"
| 2009-05-19 || Win ||align=left| Sowlor || Patong Stadium || Phuket, Thailand || Decision || 5 || 2:00 || 
|-
! style=background:white colspan=9 |
|-
|-  bgcolor="#CCFFCC"
| 2009-05-04 || Win ||align=left| Sowler || Bangla Stadium || Phuket, Thailand || Decision || 5 || 2:00 ||  
|-
|-  bgcolor="#CCFFCC"
| 2009-03-20 || Win ||align=left| Rena Kubota || K-1 Award & MAX Korea 2009 || Seoul, South Korea || Ext R. Decision (2–1) || 4 || 2:00 ||  
|-
|-  bgcolor="#CCFFCC"
| 2008-09-12|| Win ||align=left|  || Bangla Stadium || Phuket, Thailand || TKO|| 2 ||  ||  
|-
|-  bgcolor="#CCFFCC"
| 2008|| Win ||align=left| Sowler  || Patong Stadium || Phuket, Thailand || Decision || 5 || 2:00 ||  
|-
|-  bgcolor="#CCFFCC"
| 2008-03-30 || Win ||align=left| Ashley Lee || The Khan 1 || Seoul, South Korea || TKO (broken nose)  || 3 ||  ||    
|-
|-  bgcolor="#FFBBBB"
| 2007-12 || Loss ||align=left| Jemyma Betrian || IFMA World Muaythai Championships 2007, Semi Finals || Bangkok, Thailand || Decision  || 3 || 2:00 ||  
|-
! style=background:white colspan=9 |
|-
|-
|-  bgcolor="#CCFFCC"
| 2007-12-01 || Win ||align=left|  || IFMA World Muaythai Championships 2007, Quarter Finals || Bangkok, Thailand || Decision  || 3 || 2:00 ||   
|-
|-  bgcolor="#CCFFCC"
| 2006-11-23 || Win ||align=left| Yeon Sil Jeon  || Neo Fight 9 || Seoul, South Korea || Decision (3–0) || 3 || 3:00 ||
|-
|-  bgcolor="#FFBBBB"
| 2006-07-07 || Loss ||align=left| Tomomi Sunaba || Cub*Kick's 3 days 1st - AJ Night: Tradition || Tokyo, Japan || Decision (0–2) || 3 || 3:00 || 17-5 
|-
|-  bgcolor="#FFBBBB"
| 2006-06-03 || Loss ||align=left| Olga Ivanova || IFMA World Muaythai Championships 2006, Quarter Finals || Bangkok, Thailand || Decision  || 3 ||  2:00 || 17-4 
|-
|-
| colspan=9 | Legend:

Mixed martial arts record

|-
| Win
| align=center| 1–0
| Emiko Raika
| Decision (unanimous)
| Revolution 2: Start of the Revolution
| 
| align=center|2
| align=center|5:00
| Seoul, South Korea
|
|}

Filmography

Film

See also
List of female kickboxers

References

External links
Lim Su-Jeong Awakening Profile
Profile at K-1
Profile at J-Girls 

1985 births
Sportspeople from Seoul
South Korean female kickboxers
South Korean Muay Thai practitioners
Living people
Female Muay Thai practitioners
Bantamweight kickboxers
Featherweight kickboxers
South Korean female mixed martial artists
Mixed martial artists utilizing Muay Thai
Mixed martial artists utilizing kickboxing